Miss Belgium 2013 was the 45th edition of the Miss Belgium held on January 7, 2013 at the Casino Knokke in  Knokke, Belgium. The winner Noémie Happart went to Miss World 2013 and placed in top 15. Noémie also won Miss Sport Belgium that evening.

Winner and runners-up

Special awards

References

External links

Miss Belgium
2013 beauty pageants
2013 in Belgium